In the Middle Ages, the Volga trade route connected Northern Europe and Northwestern Russia with the Caspian Sea and the Sasanian Empire, via the Volga River. The Rus used this route to trade with Muslim countries on the southern shores of the Caspian Sea, sometimes penetrating as far as Baghdad. Chess was introduced to Old Russia via the Caspian-Volga trade routes from Persia and Arabic lands.

The route functioned concurrently with the Dnieper trade route, better known as the trade route from the Varangians to the Greeks, and lost its importance in the 11th century.

Establishment

The Volga trade route was established by the Varangians who settled in Northwestern Russia in the early 9th century. Archaeological evidence suggests Rus trading activities along the Volga trade route as early as the end of the 8th century. The earliest and the richest finds of Arabic coins in Europe were discovered on the territory of present-day Russia, particularly along the Volga, at Timerevo in the district of Yaroslavl. A hoard of coins found at Petergof, near Saint Petersburg, contains twenty coins with graffiti in Arabic, Khazar runic, Greek, and Old Norse runic, the latter accounting for more than half of the total. These coins include Sassanid, Arab, and Arabo-Sassanid dirhams, the latest of them dated to 804–805. Having examined major finds of Arabic coins in Eastern Europe, Valentin Yanin conclusively demonstrated that the earliest monetary system of early Russia was based on the early type of dirham minted in Africa. Furthermore, Iranian lusterware was already discovered in the Oka and Upper Volga regions (more precisely, it is spread in Rostov, Yaroslavl, Suzdal, Tver, Moscow and  Ryazan).

Functioning

From Aldeigjuborg, the Rus could travel up the Volkhov River to Novgorod, then to Lake Ilmen and further along the Lovat River. Taking their boats around 3 kilometers over a portage, they reached the sources of Volga. The traders brought furs, honey, and slaves through territory held by Finnish and Permian tribes down to the land of the Volga Bulgars. From there, they continued by way of the Volga, to the Khazar Khaganate, whose capital Atil was a busy entrepot on the shore of the Caspian Sea. From Atil, the Rus merchants traveled across the sea to join the caravan routes leading to Baghdad. In 9th and 10th centuries the river was also major trade route between Russians, Khazars and Volga Bulgars. Furthermore the Volga connected merchants from Volga Bulgaria with people from Scandinavia and the southern Byzantine Empire, as well with Russians and Ugrians.

Around 885–886, ibn Khordadbeh wrote about the Rus merchants who brought goods from Northern Europe and Northwestern Russia to Baghdad: 

In ibn Khordadbeh's account, the Rus are described as "a kind of the Saqaliba", a term usually used to refer to Slavs, and anti-Normanist scholars have interpreted this passage as indicative of the Rus being Slavs rather than Scandinavians. In the interpretation of the Normanist scholars, the word Saqaliba was also frequently applied to all fair-haired, ruddy-complexioned population of Central, Eastern, and Northeastern Europe, so ibn Khordadbeh's language is ambiguous here (see Rus' (people) for details of the dispute between Normanists and Antinormanists).

Modern scholars have also clashed over the interpretation of ibn Khordadbeh's report that the Rus used Saqlab interpreters. Anti-Normanists construed this passage as evidence that the Rus and their interpreters shared a common Slavic mother tongue. Slavic, however, was a lingua franca in the Eastern Europe at that time.

The Persian geographer ibn Rustah described the Rus communities living along Volga:

In 921–922, ibn Fadlan was a member of a diplomatic delegation sent from Baghdad to Volga Bulgars, and he left an account of his personal observations about the Rus of the Volga region, who dealt in furs and slaves. Johannes Brøndsted interpreted ibn Fadlan's commentary as indicating that these Rus retained their Scandinavian customs regarding weapons, punishments, ship-burials, and religious sacrifices. Ibn Fadlan's account includes a detailed description of the Rus praying and making sacrifices for success in trade:

On the other hand, the Rus came under foreign influence in such matters as dead chief's costume and in the habit of overloading of their women with jewelry:

Decline
The Volga trade route lost its importance by the 11th century due to the decline of silver output in the Abbasid caliphate, and thus, the trade route from the Varangians to the Greeks, which ran down the Dnieper to the Black Sea and the Byzantine Empire,  gained more weight. The Icelandic saga Yngvars saga víðförla describes an expedition of Swedes into the Caspian launched around 1041 from Sweden by Ingvar the Far-Travelled (Ingvar Vittfarne in Norse), who went down the Volga into the land of the Saracens (Serkland). The expedition was unsuccessful, and afterwards, no attempts were made to reopen the route between the Baltic and Caspian seas by the Norsemen.

Notes

References 
 Brøndsted, Johannes (1965). The Vikings. (transl. by Kalle Skov). Penguin Books.
 Golden, P.B. (2006) "Rus." Encyclopaedia of Islam (Brill Online). Eds.: P. Bearman, Th. Bianquis, C.E. Bosworth, E. van Donzel and W.P. Heinrichs. Brill.
 Logan, Donald F. (1992). The Vikings in History 2nd ed. Routledge. 
 Noonan, Thomas Schaub (1987–1991). "When Did Rus/Rus' Merchants First Visit Khazaria and Baghdad?" Archivum Eurasiae Medii Aevi 7, pp. 213–219.
 Thunberg, Carl L. (2010). Ingvarståget och dess monument. Göteborgs universitet. CLTS. , 
 Thunberg, Carl L. (2011). Särkland och dess källmaterial. Göteborgs universitet. CLTS. , 

Economic history of Russia
Water transport in Russia
Sea lanes
Varangians
Medieval economics
Slave trade